The Stratus is a German single-place paraglider that was designed and produced by Swing Flugsportgeräte of Landsberied. It is now out of production.

Design and development
The Stratus was designed as a competition and cross country glider.

The design progressed through eight generations of models, plus the Core and WRC, each improving on the last. The models are each named for their approximate projected wing area in square metres.

Operational history
Reviewer Noel Bertrand noted the Status in a 2003 review for its high top speed.

Variants

Stratus 2
Stratus 2 25
Mid-sized model for medium-weight pilots.
Stratus 2 27
Large-sized model for heavier pilots.

Stratus 4
Stratus 4 22 RC
Small-sized model for lighter pilots. The glider model is AFNOR Competition certified.
Stratus 4 24 RC
Mid-sized model for medium-weight pilots. The glider model is AFNOR Competition certified.
Stratus 4 26 RC
Large-sized model for heavier pilots. The glider model is AFNOR Competition certified.

Stratus 5
Stratus 5 21
Extra small-sized model for very lightweight pilots. The glider model is LTF BE certified.
Stratus 5 22
Small-sized model for lightweight pilots. The glider model is LTF BE certified.
Stratus 5 23
Mid-sized model for medium-weight pilots. The glider model is LTF BE certified.
Stratus 5 24
Mid-sized model for medium-weight pilots. The glider model is LTF BE certified.
Stratus 5 25
Large-sized model for heavier pilots. The glider model is LTF BE certified.
Stratus 5 26
Extra large-sized model for much heavier pilots. The glider model is LTF BE certified.

Stratus 6
Stratus 6 20
Extra small-sized model for very lightweight pilots. The glider model is LTF BE certified.
Stratus 6 21
Extra small-sized model for very lightweight pilots. The glider model is LTF BE certified.
Stratus 6 22
Small-sized model for lightweight pilots. The glider model is LTF BE certified.
Stratus 6 23
Mid-sized model for medium-weight pilots. The glider model is LTF BE certified.
Stratus 6 24
Mid-sized model for medium-weight pilots. The glider model is LTF BE certified.
Stratus 6 25
Large-sized model for heavier pilots. The glider model is LTF BE certified.
Stratus 6 26
Extra large-sized model for much heavier pilots. The glider model is LTF BE certified.
Stratus 6 27
Extra large-sized model for much heavier pilots. The glider model is LTF BE certified.

Stratus 7
Stratus 7 20
Extra small-sized model for very lightweight pilots. The glider model is LTF BE certified.
Stratus 7 21
Extra small-sized model for very lightweight pilots. The glider model is LTF BE certified.
Stratus 7 22
Small-sized model for lightweight pilots. The glider model is LTF GS 2-3 certified.
Stratus 7 23
Mid-sized model for medium-weight pilots. The glider model is LTF GS 2-3 certified.
Stratus 7 24
Mid-sized model for medium-weight pilots. The glider model is LTF GS 2-3 certified.
Stratus 7 25
Large-sized model for heavier pilots. The glider model is LTF BE certified.
Stratus 7 26
Extra large-sized model for much heavier pilots. The glider model is LTF BE certified.
Stratus 7 27
Extra large-sized model for much heavier pilots. The glider model is LTF BE certified.

Stratus 8
Stratus 8 22
Extra small-sized model for very lightweight pilots. The glider model is LTF and CEN EN-D certified.
Stratus 8 23
Small-sized model for lightweight pilots. The glider model is LTF and CEN EN-D certified.
Stratus 8 24
Mid-sized model for medium-weight pilots. The glider model is LTF and CEN EN-D certified.
Stratus 8 25
Large-sized model for heavier pilots. The glider model is LTF and CEN EN-D certified.
Stratus 8 26
Extra large-sized model for much heavier pilots. The glider model is not certified.

Stratus Core
Stratus Core 21
Extra small-sized model for very lightweight pilots. The glider model is not certified.
Stratus Core 22
Small-sized model for lightweight pilots. The glider model is not certified.
Stratus Core 23
Mid-sized model for medium-weight pilots. The glider model is not certified.
Stratus Core 24
Large-sized model for heavier pilots. The glider model is not certified.
Stratus Core 25
Extra large-sized model for much heavier pilots. The glider model is not certified.

Stratus WRC
Stratus WRC 20
Extra small-sized model for very lightweight pilots. The glider model is LTF BE certified.
Stratus WRC 21
Extra small-sized model for very lightweight pilots. The glider model is LTF BE certified.
Stratus WRC 22
Small-sized model for lightweight pilots. The glider model is LTF GS 2-3 certified.
Stratus WRC 23
Mid-sized model for medium-weight pilots. The glider model is LTF GS 2-3 certified.
Stratus WRC 24
Mid-sized model for medium-weight pilots. The glider model is LTF GS 2-3 certified.
Stratus WRC 25
Large-sized model for heavier pilots. The glider model is LTF BE certified.
Stratus WRC 26
Extra large-sized model for much heavier pilots. The glider model is LTF BE certified.

Specifications (Stratus 4 24 RC)

References

External links

Stratus
Paragliders